The following is a list of episodes for the television sitcom Love & War. The series premiered on September 21, 1992, on CBS.

Series overview

Episodes

Season 1 (1992–93)

Season 2 (1993–94)

Season 3 (1994–95)

External links
 
 

Lists of American sitcom episodes